Lars Sebastiaan Bos (born 3 October 1995), better known by his artistic name Snelle, is a Dutch rapper and singer born in Gorssel, Netherlands, originating from Deventer.

Bos studied at the Herman Brood Academie. His first major hit was "Scars", which peaked at number 4 on the Dutch Singles Chart and was certified platinum. "Plankgas" followed as a joint hit with Frenna. Born with a cleft lip, he was bullied for his appearance. His song "Reünie" that peaked on the Dutch charts is an autobiographical story about what he had experienced growing up. In June 2019, Snelle won the FunX Music Award in the "Best Song" category for his song "Scars". His album Vierentwintig has been nominated for IMPALA's European Independent Album of the Year Award (2019).

Discography

Albums

EPs

Singles

Featured in

Other charted songs

References

Dutch rappers
1995 births
Living people